Upytė (in Lithuanian 'rivulet, little river') could refer to several Lithuanian toponyms:

 Settlements
 Upytė, a village in Panevėžys District Municipality, a center of Upytė Eldership
 Upytė, Kaunas, a village Kaunas District Municipality
 Upytė, Vilnius, a former hamlet, now a Vilnius city part

Rivers
 Upytė (river in Panevėžys District Municipality), a tributary of the Nevėžis in Panevėžys District Municipality
 Upytė (river in Kėdainiai District Municipality), a tributary of the Nevėžis in Kėdainiai District Municipality
 Upytė (river in Kaunas District Municipality), a tributary of the Nevėžis in Kaunas District Municipality
 Upytė (Tatula tributary), a tributary of the Tatula in Biržai District Municipality and Pasvalys District Municipality
 Upytė (Dubysa tributary), a tributary of the Dubysa in Raseiniai District Municipality

 Other
 Upytė Hillfort, a hillfort in Panevėžys District Municipality
 Upytė Land, an ancient Samogitian land

See also
Upyna (disambiguation)